David Charles McGrath (10 November 1872 – 31 July 1934) was an Australian politician. Originally a member of the Australian Labor Party, he joined Joseph Lyons in the 1931 Labor split that led to the formation of the United Australia Party.

Early life

McGrath was born at Newtown, Victoria to David McGrath, an Irish-born miner, and Evelyn, née Horsefield, an Englishwoman. He attended Newtown State and Creswick Grammar schools before working at the family store at Allendale. He was a member of the South Ballarat football team during the 1890s. He married Elizabeth Johnstone Gullan in Ballarat on 24 May 1898; the couple moved to Pitfield Plains in 1900 to expand the family business.

State politics

In 1904, McGrath was elected to the Victorian Legislative Assembly for Labor, representing the seat of Grenville. He became known as a spokesman for the mining industry, and earned the nickname "Bull" for his promotion of Labor in country areas; with Frank Anstey, he travelled extensively in the Gippsland area in November 1904.

Federal politics

In May 1913, McGrath transferred to the federal House of Representatives, representing the seat of Ballaarat. A vocal advocate for improved conditions for soldiers, McGrath enlisted in the armed forces in March 1916, travelling overseas as part of the Australian Imperial Force. He was promoted to warrant officer in December 1916 and was discharged as medically unfit in 1918.

McGrath lost the 1919 election by a single vote to Nationalist challenger Edwin Kerby. However, McGrath alleged irregularities in the count. As a result, the election was declared void and a by-election was held in July 1920, in which McGrath was elected. He continued to support soldiers' issues, notably repatriation benefits, and criticised the method of bestowing Imperial honours.

Following the election of the Scullin Government at the 1929 federal election, McGrath was elected chairman of committees. In the wake of the Great Depression he became drawn to Sir Otto Niemeyer's solution to the nation's financial situation. As a result, in 1931 he was one of the Labor members who joined Joseph Lyons in leaving the Labor Party and merging with the Nationalists to form the United Australia Party (UAP). He was thus reunited with a number of former Labor members who favoured conscription in World War I; he had opposed it at the time.

McGrath remained chairman of committees until parliament was dissolved prior to the 1931 election. He was re-elected as a UAP member and continued in parliament until his death from ill health in 1934. He was buried in Ballarat, and was survived by his wife, two daughters and two sons.

References

 

1872 births
1934 deaths
Australian Labor Party members of the Parliament of Australia
United Australia Party members of the Parliament of Australia
Members of the Australian House of Representatives for Ballarat
Members of the Australian House of Representatives
South Ballarat Football Club players
Members of the Victorian Legislative Assembly
20th-century Australian politicians
Australian rules footballers from Victoria (Australia)
Australian military personnel of World War I